Vaccari is a surname. Notable people with the surname include:

Frédéric Vaccari (born 1987), French rugby league footballer
Marco Vaccari (born 1966), Italian sprinter
Oreste Vaccari (1886–1980), Italian orientalist and linguist
Paolo Vaccari (born 1971), Italian rugby player
Ermes Vaccari (born 2004), Romanian Clash Royale E-Sports Player